South Direction Island is 25 km north-east of Cape Flattery in the Great Barrier Reef Marine Park Authority and about 25 km south of Lizard Island, Queensland, Australia.

References

Islands on the Great Barrier Reef